Pierre Falcone (born 19 March 1954 in Algiers) is a French businessman. He is the Chairman of Pierson Capital Group.

Early life 
Falcone is the son of Pierre Falcone senior, who created Papa Falcone, a fully integrated operation in the fish industry in Algeria. Born in Algeria, Falcone and his parents moved to France when he was eight years old. His parents moved from Algeria along with other French citizens when the country became independent in 1962. Falcone studied law and economics at the University of Aix-en-Provence from 1973 to 1975.

Career 
Falcone moved to Brazil in 1977 at the age of 24; he soon started a business in trading agricultural products.
He developed a wide portfolio of clients and partners throughout South America in the following years which led him to represent several French and Chinese companies in countries such as Brazil or Mexico.

Falcone moved in 1988 to China, where he later founded and headquartered his company Pierson Capital Asia.

He  started his Chinese operations with consulting services for leading European companies looking to establish themselves in China. He negotiated the first insurance authorization granted by China to a Western company for French giant AXA as well as the involvement of Aerospatiale in the making of the first Chinese communication satellite.

In 1993, Pierre Falcone negotiated financing for the MPLA government of Angola during its civil war against UNITA. This financing was achieved in exchange for the future oil production of Angola for French interests. The subsequent delivery of weapons to support José Eduardo dos Santos's Angolan government led to a trial known as Angolagate in France. In 2011, the charges against Falcone were dropped by an appeals court after he had served half of his sentence in a French prison. The appeals court acknowledged that Falcone had been officially mandated by the Angolan government to acquire arms as well as food and medicine.

The company he heads, Pierson Capital Group, invests in hotels, real estate developments, agriculture and agroindustrial projects, oil, gas, and personal authentication systems. Pierson Capital Group and has over 2600 employees and three main operations in Beijing, Luanda, and Mexico City.

Private life 
Pierre Falcone is married to former Miss Bolivia and artist Sonia Falcone. They have three children.

Honors 

On June 17, 2013, Pierre Falcone was conferred honorary doctor of philosophy degrees at the Hebrew University of Jerusalem for being a supporter of brain sciences.

References

External links 
 Chairman Statement by Pierre Falcone

1954 births
Living people
People from Algiers
Mitterrand–Pasqua affair
French businesspeople
Pieds-Noirs
French prisoners and detainees
Prisoners and detainees of France